Susan Taubes (née Feldmann; 1928 – 6 November 1969) was a Hungarian-American writer and intellectual.

Taubes was born in Budapest, Hungary, into a Jewish family. Her grandfather Mózes Feldmann (1860–1927) was the head of the Conservative or "Status Quo" branch of the divided Hungarian rabbinate in Pest, and her father Sándor Feldmann (1889/90–1972) was a psychoanalyst of Sándor Ferenczi's school, though the two colleagues had a falling out in 1923.

Biography 
In 1939, Susan Feldmann emigrated to the United States with her father (but without her mother, Marion Batory). She studied at Harvard, wrote her PhD thesis on The Absent God. A Study of Simone Weil, supervised by Paul Tillich, and published on philosophy and religion.

She was the first wife of the philosopher and Judaist scholar Jacob Taubes.  The couple both taught religion at Columbia University 1960–1969.  They had two children: Ethan (b. 1953) and Tania (b. 1956).

In the mid-1960s, she became also involved in literature and the stage: she was a member of The Open Theatre and in a group of writers around Susan Sontag.

She compiled "African Myths and Tales," published in New York in 1963 under her maiden name, and published her first novel, Divorcing, in 1969. Taubes committed suicide shortly after publication by drowning herself off Long Island in East Hampton. Her body was identified by Susan Sontag.

She left numerous literary texts, most of them unpublished, as well as years of correspondence with Jacob Taubes and other prominent figures of philosophy and religion. Most of this estate was discovered years after her death, transferred to Berlin in 2001, where Sigrid Weigel established the Susan Taubes Archiv e.V. at  the Berlin-based Zentrum für Literatur- und Kulturforschung/ZfL (Center for Literature and Culture Research). and, together with Christina Pareigis, worked on an edition of Susan Taubes’ Schriften. In 2021 Pareigis published Susan Taubes’ intellectual biography.

References

Further reading
The first major study of Susan Taubes's thought by Elliot R. Wolfson, The Philosophic Pathos of Susan Taubes: Between Nihilism and Hope, will be published by Stanford University Press in 2023.

1928 births
1969 suicides
20th-century American women writers
Columbia University faculty
Harvard University alumni
Suicides in New York (state)
American women novelists
20th-century American novelists
Novelists from New York (state)
1969 deaths
American women academics